A Dos Tiempos de un Tiempo is the seventh studio album recorded by Puerto Rican salsa singer Gilberto Santa Rosa released on October 16, 1992. It is a tribute album to Tito Rodríguez.

Track listing
This information adapted from Allmusic.

Chart performance

Certification

References

1992 albums
Gilberto Santa Rosa albums
Sony Discos albums